Sir Charles Henry Coote, 9th Baronet (2 January 1794 – 8 October 1864) was an Irish Conservative and Tory politician.

Family and early life
Coote was the son of Chidley Coote of Ash Hill, County Limerick, and Elizabeth Anne née Carr. Educated at Eton College (leaving in 1805) and Trinity College, Cambridge (leaving in 1809), he married Caroline Whaley (daughter of John Whaley) in 1814. They had five sons and two daughters, including: Charles Henry (1815–1895); John Chidley (1816–1879); Algernon (1817–1899); Caroline (1819–1848); Robert (1820–1898); and Chidley Downes (1829–1872).

Baronetcy
A distant descendant of Sir Charles Coote, 1st Baronet, he succeeded to the Coote baronetcy in 1802 upon the death of Charles Coote, 7th Earl of Mountrath. Upon his own death in 1864, the title passed to his eldest son, Sir Charles Henry Coote, 10th Baronet.

Member of Parliament
While he initially stood unsuccessfully in 1818 and 1820, Coote was first elected Tory MP for Queen's County at a by-election in 1821—caused by the elevation of William Wellesley-Pole to Lord Maryborough—and, becoming a Conservative in 1834, held the seat until 1847, when he did not seek re-election. During this period, he was known as a lax attender, and he generally divided with the Tory leader Lord Liverpool, occasionally siding with the Whigs on matters such as the abolition of joint-postmasterships and inquiries into the borough franchise.

He returned at the next election in 1852 and held the seat until 1859 when he, again, did not seek re-election.

References

External links
 

UK MPs 1820–1826
UK MPs 1826–1830
UK MPs 1830–1831
UK MPs 1831–1832
UK MPs 1832–1835
UK MPs 1835–1837
UK MPs 1837–1841
UK MPs 1841–1847
UK MPs 1852–1857
UK MPs 1857–1859
Irish Conservative Party MPs
Tory MPs (pre-1834)
1794 births
1864 deaths
Baronets in the Baronetage of Ireland
Alumni of Trinity College, Cambridge
People educated at Eton College
Members of the Parliament of the United Kingdom for Queen's County constituencies (1801–1922)